On 1 April 2018, Al-Shabaab fighters attacked an AMISOM base in Bulo Marer in the Lower Shebelle region of Somalia.

Attack 
Two trucks filled with explosives blew up at the AMISOM military camp in Bula Marer, 110 km south of Mogadishu. Then about 100 Al-Shabaab militants attacked the base with gunfire. Another suicide bomber rammed his vehicle packed with explosives into a military convoy carrying Ugandan soldiers from Golweyn. According to the Deputy Governor of Lower Shabelle region Ali Nur Mohamed, AMISOM troops destroyed the vehicle with a rocket propelled grenade. The militants also attacked a third AMISOM base in Barawe with mortars and launched infantry attacks on two Somali government positions in Qoryoley and Mashallay. These attacks were reportedly intended to distract the troops in those camps from supporting the forces in Bulo Marer. Witnesses said Al-Shabaab terrorists attacked civilians and set houses and shops on fire after they raided the military base.

Ali Nur Mohamed told VOA Somali that AMISOM and Somali troops repulsed all attacks.

Casualties 
The death toll was not clear. Uganda People's Defense Force spokesman Richard Karemire said four Ugandan peacekeepers were killed and six AMISOM troops injured. Thirty Al-Shabaab terrorists were killed according to his reports. Al-Shabaab's military operations spokesperson Abdiaziz Abu Mus'ab said that the group lost only 14 fighters and killed at least 59 African Union soldiers. Abdi Nur Hashi, a Somali military colonel stationed near the base, told the Guardian that as many as 46 Ugandan troops died in the attack. One Somali soldier died and several others were injured.

References

2018 murders in Somalia
Al-Shabaab (militant group) attacks
April 2018 events in Africa
Mass murder in 2018
Mass murder in Somalia
Terrorist incidents in Somalia in 2018
Somali Civil War (2009–present)
April 2018 crimes in Africa
Conflicts in 2018